Cliffe may refer to:

Places in England
 Cliffe, Kent, a village
 Cliffe, Richmondshire, North Yorkshire, a village and civil parish
 Cliffe, Selby, North Yorkshire, a village and civil parish
 Cliffe, a village that is now a part of Lewes, Sussex
 Cliffe Hill, east of Lewes
 Cliffe Fort, a disused artillery fort at the mouth of the Thames River

People
 Bruce Cliffe (born 1946), New Zealand businessman and former politician
 Frederic Cliffe (1857–1931), English composer, organist and teacher
 Fred E. Cliffe (1885–1957), English songwriter
 Jess Cliffe (born 1987), video game designer
 Joel Cliffe (born 1980), English former first-class cricketer
 Lionel Cliffe (1936–2013), English political economist and activist
 Michael Cliffe (1903–1964), British politician
 Rebecca Cliffe (born 1990), British zoologist

Other uses
 The Cliffe, a residence in Peppermint Grove, Western Australia
 Cliffe railway station, Cliffe-at-Hoo, Kent, England
 Cliffe railway station, renamed Hemingbrough railway station, Hemingbrough, North Yorkshire, England